Krzysztof R. Apt (born 26 December 1949 in Katowice, Poland)
is a Polish computer scientist. He defended his PhD in mathematical logic in
Warsaw, Poland in 1974. His research interests include program correctness and semantics, use
of logic as a programming language, distributed computing, and game theory. Besides his own research, he has been heavily involved in service to
the computing community, notably by promoting the
use of logic in computer science (in particular by founding a new
journal) and by advocating open access to scientific literature.

Academic career
Apt has held various scientific positions in Poland, the Netherlands,
France, the U.S. (the William B. Blakemore II Professor, Computer
Science, UT Austin, 1987-1990), and Singapore (Visiting
Professor, Computer Science, NUS, 2002-2005).

Apt is a Fellow at CWI (National Research Institute for Mathematics and Computer Science)
in Amsterdam and Affiliated Professor at the University of Warsaw. Since 2014 he is also Professor Emeritus at the University of Amsterdam.

His research interests include program correctness and semantics, use
of logic as a programming language, distributed computing, and game theory. In particular, with coauthors he introduced the concept of
stratification in logic programming to provide a way to deal with
negation in logic and datalog programs. His comprehensive survey of Hoare logic, written with
Ernst-Rüdiger Olderog, summarizes
the history of the subject since its inception in 1969.

Apt is a member of Academia Europaea, which serves as "a pan-European Academy of Sciences, Humanities and Letters"; membership is by invitation only and follows a rigorous peer review selection process.
He is the founder and first
Editor-in-Chief of the ACM Transactions on Computational Logic and
past president of the Association for Logic Programming (ALP). He is one of the three initiators of the Witold Lipski Prize for Young Researchers in Computer Science.

Apt has long been an active advocate of open and free access to scientific
publications(e.g.) and is a member of the Advisory Committee of the portion of the repository arXiv known as the Computing Research Repository (CoRR)

Books published

Books Edited
 

  Presents results from a three-year, ESPRIT-funded effort to explore the integration of the foundational issues of functional, logic, and object-oriented programming

  Reveals the evolution of logic programming since its inception and the impressively broad scope of current research in the field

 

 In the ACM series of books on Turing Award winners

References

External links
 CWI home page: 
 CWI staff page: 
 Polish Science webpage: 
 Google scholar: 
 ResearchGate: 
 Springer link: 
 dblp computer science bibliography: 
 arxiv: 

Living people
Programming language researchers
Formal methods people
1949 births
Polish computer scientists